Francis Pugh House is a historic home located near Clinton, Sampson County, North Carolina.   It was built about 1850, and is a one-story, double-pile center hall plan, Greek Revival style frame dwelling.  It has a cross gable roof, brick pier foundation, and is sheathed in weatherboard. The front facade features a large, three bay gable front porch, supported by six Doric order pillars and two pilasters.  It was restored in 1972 for an antique store.

It was added to the National Register of Historic Places in 1986.

References

Houses on the National Register of Historic Places in North Carolina
Greek Revival houses in North Carolina
Houses completed in 1850
Houses in Sampson County, North Carolina
National Register of Historic Places in Sampson County, North Carolina